The 1955 Wichita Shockers football team was an American football team that represented the University of Wichita (now known as Wichita State University) as a member of the Missouri Valley Conference during the 1955 college football season. In its first season under head coach Pete Tillman, the team compiled a 9–1 record (4–0 against MVC opponents), tied for the MVC championship, and outscored opponents by a total of 252 to 132. The team played its home games at Veterans Field, now known as Cessna Stadium.

Schedule

References

Wichita
Wichita State Shockers football seasons
Missouri Valley Conference football champion seasons
Wichita Shockers football